The Tampa Bay Rays are a professional baseball franchise based in St. Petersburg, Florida. They are a member of the American League (AL) East in Major League Baseball (MLB). The team joined MLB in 1998 as an expansion team with the Arizona Diamondbacks. In November 2007, Rays owner Stuart Sternberg renamed his team from the "Tampa Bay Devil Rays" to the "Tampa Bay Rays", which he described as "A beacon that radiates throughout Tampa Bay and across the entire state of Florida." The Rays have won two American League Championships, first in 2008, and again in 2020. The Rays have played their home games at Tropicana Field since their inaugural season. Andrew Friedman is the Vice President of Baseball operations, in essence the general manager.

There have been five managers for the Rays franchise. The team's first manager was Larry Rothschild, the only manager who have spent his entire MLB managing career with the Devil Rays and managed the team for four seasons. Through the end of the 2014 season, Joe Maddon is the franchise's all-time leader for the most regular-season games managed with 1,459 and the most regular-season game wins with 754. Maddon was the first manager to have been to the playoffs with the Rays. In 2008, he took them all the way to the World Series, losing to the Philadelphia Phillies in five games. Maddon is the first manager to have won the Manager of the Year Award with the Rays, first winning it in 2008, and again in 2011. Maddon became the manager of the then-Devil Rays in 2006. On February 15, 2012 the Rays extended his contract through the 2015 season, however he opted out of his contract at the end of the 2014 season. Kevin Cash has been the team's manager since the  season. In  the team reached the playoffs, losing in the Division Series in five games. In , they advanced to the World Series, however they lost in six games. Cash, the manager with the highest regular-season winning percentage with .537, won the AL Manager of the Year Award in 2020 to become the second manager in Rays history to win the award. He then won the award the following year to be the first Rays manager to win the award in consecutive years.

Key

Managers
Note: Statistics are correct through the 2021 Season

Notes 
 A running total of the number of managers of the (Devil) Rays. Thus, any manager who has two or more separate terms as a manager is only counted once.
 Each year is linked to an article about that particular MLB season.

References 
General
 
 
 

Specific

Tampa Bay Rays managers
Lists of Major League Baseball managers
Managers